Yle TV1 (Yleisradio - Finnish Broadcasting Company TV1;) is a Finnish television channel owned and operated by Finnish public broadcaster Yle. It is the second oldest (after TES-TV) and the oldest existing television channel in Finland. More than 70% of channel's programs are documentaries, news or educational programmes. Its name is commonly referred to as Ykkönen; the name is derived from Yle's ownership of channel spots 1 and 2 by default in Finland; the other, spot 2 channel, is Yle TV2.

History 
The channel started test transmissions on 13 August 1957, and began regular broadcasts on 1 January 1958 as Suomen Televisio. When Yleisradio took over Tampere-based Tamvisio in 1964, Suomen Televisio was renamed TV-ohjelma 1 and Tamvisio became TV-ohjelma 2 – and when they started broadcasting in colour in the 1970s, they were rebranded again, as TV1 and TV2.

Logos and identities

Notable programming
Arto Nyberg
Sorjonen
Puoli Seitsemän (At half past six talk-show)
Uutisvuoto
Urheiluruutu (Sport-News)
Ylen Aamu-TV (Yle's Morning-TV)
Yle Uutiset (Yle News)
A Studio

Imports
800 Words
Agatha Christie's Marple
Agatha Christie's Poirot
A Place to Call Home
DCI Banks
Death in Paradise
Dawson's Creek
Doc Martin
Happy Valley
Heartbeat
House of Cards
Inspector George Gently
Midsomer Murders
Murdoch Mysteries
National Treasure
The Capture
The Royal
The Blacklist
The Young Pope
Vera Stanhope

Upcoming imports
 Elinor Wonders Why

References

External links
 Official site 

Yle television channels
Television channels and stations established in 1958
1958 establishments in Finland